While the production of bananas for export is largely in the hands of large commercial companies, such as Chiquita or Dole, the Caribbean, and particularly the Windward Islands, are notable for the production of bananas by small holders for export.

Peasant banana producers focus their attention on the popular Cavendish banana, as these are the fruit of choice on markets in Europe. In the Caribbean, and especially in Dominica where this sort of cultivation is widespread, holdings are in the 1-2 acre range. In many cases the farmer earns additional money from other crops, from engaging in labor outside the farm, and from a share of the earnings of relatives living overseas. This style of cultivation often was popular in the islands as bananas required little labor input and brought welcome extra income. Vulnerability to hurricanes in particular represented a problem.

NAFTA
After the signing of the NAFTA agreements in the 1990s, however, the tide turned against peasant producers. Their costs of production were relatively high and the ending of favorable tariff and other supports, especially in the European Economic Community, made it difficult for peasant producers to compete with the bananas grown on large plantations by the well capitalized firms like Chiquita and Dole. Not only did the large companies have access to cheap labor in the areas they worked, but they were better able to afford modern agronomic advances such as fertilization. The "dollar banana" produced by these concerns made the profit margins for peasant bananas unsustainable.

Fair trade
Caribbean countries have sought to redress this problem by providing government supported agronomic services and helping to organize producers' cooperatives. They have also been supporters of the Fair Trade movement which seeks to balance the inequities in the world trade in commodities.

References

Banana production
Rural economics
History of agriculture